The 2018/19 FIS Race (ski jumping) is the 20th FIS Race regular season as the fourth level of ski jumping competition since 1999/00. Although even before the world cup and in the old days FIS Race events were all top level organized competitions.

Other competitive circuits this season included the World Cup, Grand Prix, Continental Cup, FIS Cup and Alpen Cup.

Calendar

Men

Ladies

References

2018 in ski jumping
2019 in ski jumping
FIS Race (ski jumping)